Archduchess Marie Carolina Ferdinanda of Austria (8 April 1801 – 22 May 1832) was Crown Princess of Saxony as the wife of Frederick Augustus, Crown Prince of Saxony.

Life

Marie Caroline was a daughter of Francis II, Holy Roman Emperor, later Francis I of Austria after the dissolution of the Holy Roman Empire, and Maria Teresa of the Two Sicilies, and named after an elder sister who had died in infancy. Marie Caroline's parents were double first cousins as they shared all four grandparents (Francis' paternal grandparents were his wife's maternal grandparents and vice versa).

She was educated strictly, standing out in drawing, as proven by several sketches and crayons preserved in Austria.

Crown Princess of Saxony

On 7 October 1819 she married Prince Frederick Augustus of Saxony, son of Maximilian, Prince of Saxony, and Princess Caroline of Parma, in Dresden, Germany. The marriage was childless and unhappy.

Marie Caroline was sweet and pleasant, but she experienced epilepsy and her attacks were so frequent that she was barely able to fulfill her duties as Crown Princess; they also seriously affected her marital relationship. Frederick Augustus was unfaithful on several occasions. From one of these affairs he had an illegitimate son, the musician Theodor Uhlig (1822–1853).

Maria Carolina died from an epileptic attack on 22 May 1832 at Pillnitz Castle near Dresden.

Ancestry

References

Austrian princesses
House of Habsburg-Lorraine
Saxon princesses
House of Wettin
1801 births
1832 deaths
Burials at Dresden Cathedral
Nobility from Vienna
Neurological disease deaths in Germany
People with epilepsy
Deaths from epilepsy
Austrian Roman Catholics
Crown Princesses of Saxony
Royalty and nobility with disabilities
⚭Archduchess Marie Caroline of Austria
Daughters of emperors
Children of Francis II, Holy Roman Emperor
Daughters of kings